"He" is a song about God, written in 1954. The song made the popular music charts the following year.

The music was written by Jack Richards, with lyrics by Richard Mullan. The song was originally published by Avas Music Publishing, Inc.

Background
The final lines in the two verses state:

"Though it makes him sad
to see the way we live,
He'll always say: 'I Forgive' ".

First recordings
The first recording to be released was by Al Hibbler, whose version reached No. 4 on Billboards chart of Best Sellers in Stores, No. 7 on Billboards Top 100, No. 7 on Billboards chart of Most Played by Jockeys, and No. 8 on Billboards chart of Most Played in Juke Boxes. Despite its popularity with listeners to Radio Luxenbourg, the song never reached the British charts - mainly due to the ban imposed by the BBC on popular songs with what they termed pseudo-religious lyrics and both Hibbler's and the version by the McGuire Sisters lost out due to that decision.

The McGuire Sisters also released a version of the song in 1955, which reached No. 10 on Billboards chart of Most Played in Juke Boxes, No. 12 on Billboards Top 100, No. 12 on Billboards chart of Best Sellers in Stores, and No. 16 on Billboards chart of Most Played by Jockeys.

The song was ranked No. 33 on Billboards ranking of "1955's Top Tunes", based on the Honor Roll of Hits and No. 34 on Billboards ranking of "1956's Top Tunes".

Other recordings
Andy Williams released a version on his 1960 album, The Village of St. Bernadette.
The Righteous Brothers released a version of the song in 1966, which spent eight weeks on the Billboard Hot 100 chart, peaking at No. 18.
Diana Ross & The Supremes covered the song for In Loving Memory, a 1968 gospel compilation featuring Motown Records artists.
Elvis Presley recorded the song in 1960 at his home in Bel Air.

References

External links
 Lyrics of this song
 
 

1954 songs
1955 singles
1966 singles
The McGuire Sisters songs
The Righteous Brothers songs
Andy Williams songs
Decca Records singles
Coral Records singles
Verve Records singles
Number-one singles in Australia
Christian songs
Gospel songs
Songs banned by the BBC